Pucnik  (German Simsdorf) is a village in the administrative district of Gmina Komprachcice, within Opole County, Opole Voivodeship, in south-western Poland.

References

Pucnik